The Ukrainian Catholic Eparchy of Chernivtsi is an eparchy of the Ukrainian Greek Catholic Church situated in Ukraine. The eparchy is a suffragan of the Ukrainian Catholic Archeparchy of Ivano-Frankivsk. The eparchy was established on 12 September 2017.

History
September 12, 2017: Established as Eparchy of Chernivtsi from the Ukrainian Catholic Eparchy of Kolomyia – Chernivtsi.

Eparchial bishops
The following is a list of the bishops of Chernivtsi and their terms of service:
(since 12 September 2017 – ) Yosafat Moschych

See also
Ukrainian Greek Catholic Church
 Catholic Church

External links
Profile at Catholic Hierarchy
Official Vatican news information on the eparchy

Chernivtsi
Roman Catholic dioceses and prelatures established in the 21st century
Christian organizations established in 2017